Phyllida is a feminine given name which may refer to:
 Phyllida Ashley (1894–1975), American pianist
 Phyllida Barlow (1944–2023), British sculptor
 Phyllida Law (born 1932), Scottish actress
 Phyllida Lloyd (born 1957), British film and theatre director
 Phyllida Crowley Smith (born 1968), English ballerina, theatre actress and choreographer

Feminine given names

de:Phyllida